Sean Corr (born February 21, 1984) is an American professional stock car racing driver and owner. He currently competes part-time in the ARCA Menards Series, driving the No. 8 Chevrolet SS for Empire Racing. Corr is also the president of Educational Bus Transportation, a school bus provider on Long Island.

Racing career

Camping World Truck Series
Corr has made 6 starts in the Camping World Truck Series. He drove his family-owned truck entry at Daytona, Talladega, Eldora and Pocono. His best finish was 20th in the Aspen Dental Eldora Dirt Derby in 2015. In 2016, Corr attempted again to race at Eldora but a spin in the LCQ ended his hopes to make the field. In the following week at Pocono, Corr drove the No. 6 Chevrolet Silverado for Norm Benning Racing and finished 30th.

ARCA Menards Series
Corr usually attempts Daytona, Talladega, and Pocono events every year. In 2011 he completed in all races (full-season) and finished 9th in the championship. His best finish was 4th at Daytona in 2020 after leading 7 laps behind the wheel of his family-owned No. 8 Chevrolet. He also has a pole position in the series, at Daytona in 2012.

Camping World East Series
His only start in the NASCAR Camping World East Series was in 2009 at Thompson. Corr started 22nd and finished 16th.

Motorsports career results

NASCAR
(key) (Bold – Pole position awarded by qualifying time. Italics – Pole position earned by points standings or practice time. * – Most laps led.)

Camping World Truck Series

Camping World East Series

 Season still in progress
 Ineligible for series points

ARCA Menards Series
(key) (Bold – Pole position awarded by qualifying time. Italics – Pole position earned by points standings or practice time. * – Most laps led.)

 Season still in progress
 Ineligible for series points

References

External links
 

Living people
1984 births
NASCAR drivers
ARCA Menards Series drivers
People from Goshen, New York
Racing drivers from New York (state)